Rab Ne Bana Di Jodi, also known as RNBDJ, is a 2008 Indian Hindi-language romantic comedy film written and directed by Aditya Chopra and produced by him and his father Yash Chopra under their banner of Yash Raj Films. The film stars Shah Rukh Khan as Surinder Sahni, a mild-mannered office employee who marries his deceased teacher's miserable daughter Taani Gupta, portrayed by Anushka Sharma in her debut. His friend Balwinder "Bobby" Khosla, played by Vinay Pathak, eventually transforms him into the fun-loving actor "Raj Kapoor" to win Taani's love. The film's soundtrack was composed by Salim–Sulaiman, and it became the first Bollywood soundtrack to reach the top 10 album sales on the iTunes Store.

Rab Ne Bana Di Jodi was released worldwide on 12 December 2008 and marked Chopra's return to direction after an 8-year hiatus, following his previous directorial venture, Mohabbatein (2000), which also starred Khan. The film was not heavily promoted pre-release by either Khan or YRF, mainly due to uncertainty and apprehensions regarding cinema-market conditions following the terror attacks in Mumbai. Upon release, the film received mixed reviews from critics but broke several box-office records. It was declared a year-end super-hit, and at the end of its theatrical run, it grossed over  worldwide, becoming the highest-grossing Hindi film of the year overseas, as well as YRF and Khan's highest-grossing film at the time.

At the 54th Filmfare Awards, Rab Ne Bana Di Jodi received a leading 10 nominations, including Best Film, Best Director (Aditya), Best Actor (Khan), Best Actress (Sharma) and Best Supporting Actor (Pathak), and won 2 awards – Best Male Playback Singer (Sukhwinder Singh for "Haule Haule") and Best Scene of the Year.

The film's script was recognized by a number of critics and was invited to be included in the Margaret Herrick Library of the Academy of Motion Picture Arts and Sciences, just a day after its release. The script is accessible for research purposes only; students, filmmakers, writers, and actors are among the regular patrons.

Plot 

Surinder Sahni is a shy and mild-mannered office employee working for Punjab Power who visits the marriage ceremony of Taani Gupta, the cheerful daughter of Professor Shirish Gupta who is his former teacher. He falls in love at first sight with her but is unable to express it. Unfortunately, her fianceè and all his family members are killed in a road accident which results in the devastated Professor Gupta developing a massive heart attack. He is taken to a hospital where, on his deathbed, the dying Professor Gupta asks Surinder to marry Taani upon fearing that she will be left alone in the world after his death. Surinder agrees to this as he loves Taani anyway. Taani also agrees to fulfill her father's last wish.

After Professor Gupta's death and funeral, Surinder has an unplanned marriage with Taani and takes her to his ancestral house in Amritsar, Punjab. Over there, he begins to behave with her in a kind nature and show his respect to her - he even lets her have his bedroom all to herself and stays in the attic - but is too frightened to confess his love for her. A miserable Taani locks herself in Surinder's room all the time as she was not willing to marry Surinder. However, Surinder's close friend Balwinder Khosla alias Bobby and other office colleagues invite themselves to his house for a party after learning about his marriage from the neighbours. Surinder feels awkward as he cannot make them meet a depressed Taani but is surprised when she shows up. Later that night, Taani eventually agrees to become a good wife and thus respect her role in Surinder's life but feels that she can never love him or anyone else again.

Grateful towards her care for him, Surinder buys a new car for her and often takes her to the movie theatre to watch Hindi films as Taani has a passion of romance and dance. Later, Taani finds a poster of a dance competition in Amritsar and asks Surinder to let her participate in it, to which, he agrees and even helps her pay the fees. Surinder subsequently asks Bobby for some grooming advice which could help him win Taani's love by converting her back into a happy-go-lucky girl. Being a hair-salon owner, Bobby gives Surinder a complete makeover - which includes making him not use his spectacles, trimming off his moustache, changing his hairstyle into a fashionable spiky style and fitting him out in funky Western-style clothing with aviator-style shades and oversize pastel contact lenses, including a motorcycle to help him become a macho.

He is thus transformed into a loud and fun-loving boy named "Raj Kapoor" (who is an actor) and then goes to the venue of the dance competition to see Taani's performance. He joins the competition and at the end of the class, all the participants are put into two groups with random numbers given out by the instructors in colours red and green, respectively. Raj and Taani coincidentally have the same number - "21" - and are thus selected as each other's dance partners. Raj tries to give the "cool" images of heroes to Taani and returns home in his original form of Surinder, deciding to play this "dual role" for a few more days.

Taani eventually assures Raj that they will surely come first in the competition if they practice their dance in extra time, making him criticize Surinder's character with the hopes of winning her love. Raj and Taani become friends and start working together in their dance routine. They are eventually selected for the finals and go to have dinner at a restaurant where Raj wins the eating competition between them with Panipuris. Later that night, Taani prepares Biryani for Surinder who graciously eats it after returning home but ends up having a stomachache for overeating.

After a couple of days, Raj confesses his love for Taani by using his electric company abilities to shape the Amritsar lights to spell out "I Love You". A shocked Taani faces a dilemma despite Raj assuring her that they can still remain friends if she does not reciprocate his feelings. With tears in her eyes, she asks him to leave her alone for some time which leaves Raj confused. Meanwhile, Surinder also faces a dilemma as he cannot tell Taani of his disguise. He thus gains Bobby's advice of winning her love as "Surinder", but not as Raj.

One night, Surinder takes Taani to a trade fair where he participates in a Sumo-wrestling competition to win two airline tickets for Japan, knowing that his office salary would not be sufficient for the trip. He is severely injured and ultimately manages to defeat the huge Sumo-wrestler but Taani gets shell-shocked and infuriated at this. While dressing Surinder's injuries at home, she demands to know the reason behind his actions and begs him not to keep showering his care on her as she would not be able to repay him. Surinder understands that true love cannot be repaid and is disappointed as Taani cannot see it in his original form, but only in Raj. Later that night, Taani reunites with Raj in a garage and emotionally explains her dilemma to him. Seeing her distressed, he asks her to elope with him after the competition. A heartbroken Surinder then reveals to Bobby that he has decided to exit from Taani's life by sacrificing his cravings for her love, leaving her his property and applying for a transfer to Delhi so that she can find some suitable "Raj" for herself.

The next day, Surinder takes Taani to the Golden Temple to make her receive blessings from God for her performance and internally, also for her life without Raj. While there, Taani believes God has shown her a sign that her marriage with Surinder is divinely inspired. For the first time, she reflects on Surinder and has the realization of the strength and integrity in his character, something which she grows into love. That night, Taani confesses to Raj that she loves Surinder and tells him that she cannot choose him over her husband as it is equivalent in leaving God which is impossible. She leaves him in a state of shock with tears in his eyes but Raj is secretly happy that Taani loves his "true-self", Surinder.

When the time comes for their performance, Taani is shocked to see Surinder joining her on stage instead of Raj. While dancing, she awakens to the fact that Raj is none other than Surinder through a series of flashbacks. After their performance, Taani tearfully confronts Surinder backstage when he confesses that he "loves her more than God". She admits that she reciprocates his feelings and the two win the competition. In the end, the film leaves a message that there is an extraordinary love story in every ordinary couple.

The end credits show the couple visiting Japan on their belated honeymoon.

Cast

Main 

 Shahrukh Khan as Surinder "Suri" Sahni / Raj Kapoor
 Anushka Sharma as Taani Surinder Sahni (née Gupta)
 Vinay Pathak as Balwinder "Bobby" Khosla (Suri's friend)

Supporting 

 Aneesha Dalal as Dance Instructor
 Isha Koppikar as Dance Instructor
 Puneet Cheema as Dance Instructor
 Nilofar Salehi as Dolly (dance competitor)
 Bobby Bedi as Tiny Singh (dance competitor)
 Rajesh Jais as Mr. Brijesh Khanna (Surinder's office colleague)
 Manmeet Singh as Raju Mechanic

Cameo Appearances 

 M. K. Raina as Professor Shirish Gupta (Taani's father)
 Mark Sagato as Sumo Wrestler 
 Richa Pallod as an actress in a film in the theatre
 Areesz Gandhi as MC at Dance Competition

Special appearances during the "Phir Milenge Chalte Chalte" song (in order of appearance) 

 Kajol
 Bipasha Basu
 Lara Dutta
 Preity Zinta
 Rani Mukerji

Production

Theme 
Rab Ne Bana Di Jodi tells a story from the point of view of an ordinary person and, most importantly, conveys a message that being 'ordinary' is cool. The filmmakers were confident that it would be able to strike a chord with millions because the film has ordinary people as its target audience:

"As middle-class people, so many of us have a routine life. We wake up in the morning, get dressed, go to the office, come back, sometimes for a change we buy things to take home, watch TV, eat dinner and go to sleep. And then we repeat this day after day, week after week. Rab Ne Bana Di Jodi talks about one such man who lives a routine life. It is a simple film at heart."

Casting and filming 
In February 2008, Aditya Chopra announced that he will helm another film titled Rab Ne Bana Di Jodi and that it will star his lucky mascot, Shah Rukh Khan. The female lead was to be a newcomer who would be chosen following a massive talent hunt for a young, demure woman with quintessential Punjabi features. In May, Yash Raj announced the casting of the 19-year-old model Anushka Sharma as the leading lady opposite Khan. Yash Chopra commented: "We were looking first for someone who could truly embody the spirit of small-town Punjab. We know we have found her in Anushka. While she has no previous acting experience, we have seen that unique spark in her that makes us confident that she will be a standout even opposite Shah Rukh."

Sharma was chosen over hundreds of girls for this role and was kept hidden from the media during the filming. When asked about that, Khan said: "The idea was not to keep her a secret; we wanted her work to speak for her. When new actors come into films, it is important for people to see their work and then question them. It becomes easier after the film releases." Vinay Pathak was cast to play an important role in the film, making it his first commercial outing.

Filming began in May 2008; Yash Chopra was present at the shoot. A portion was shot with Khan at the Golden Temple in Amritsar, Punjab. Khan had to lose the six-pack abs he developed for the song "Dard-E-Disco" from Om Shanti Om (2007) since he was playing the role of a very normal, regular person.

Music 

The soundtrack of Rab Ne Bana Di Jodi was composed by Salim–Sulaiman. The lyrics of all the songs have been given by Jaideep Sahni. This marks the second collaboration of the composer duo with Shah Rukh Khan after Chak De! India (2007). The album was mixed by Vijay Dayal at YRF Studios in Mumbai and was mastered by Brian "Big Bass" Gardner at Bernie Grundman Mastering in Hollywood, Los Angeles, California.

The song "Phir Milenge Chalte Chalte" pays homage to Bollywood actors Raj Kapoor, Dev Anand, Shammi Kapoor, Rajesh Khanna and Rishi Kapoor and actresses Nargis Dutt, Sadhana Shivdasani, Helen Khan, Sharmila Tagore and Neetu Singh. The performance of the song includes appearances by Kajol Devgn, Bipasha Basu, Lara Dutta, Preity Zinta and Rani Mukerji.

Serbian pop singer Jelena Karleuša remade the song "Dance Pe Chance" as "Insomnia" in 2010. Bulgarian pop singer Ivana also made a copy of the same song as "Nedei".

The soundtrack of Rab Ne Bana Di Jodi was released on 14 November 2008. It is the first Bollywood soundtrack to reach the top 10 album sales for the iTunes Store. According to the Indian trade website Box Office India, with around 19,00,000 units sold, this film's soundtrack album was the year's second highest-selling.

Release 
Rab Ne Bana Di Jodi was released across 30 countries worldwide on 12 December 2008 on over 1,200 screens, including approximately 300 prints for the overseas market, making it the first time a Bollywood film was released on such a wide scale. Before release, the film witnessed a large volume of advance bookings. Aditya Chopra, who is known for maintaining secrecy over his films and not showing them to anyone until the day of release, made an exception and held a special screening on 23 November 2008 at Yash Raj Studios. The screening was attended by Khan and his family, Karan Johar, Yash Chopra, and debutante Sharma.

There was a huge debate in the industry whether Aditya Chopra's decision to go ahead with the release of the film in the wake of the terror strikes in Mumbai was the right one. With the trauma of the terrorist attacks on Mumbai city on 26, 27, and 28 November still fresh, there was divided opinion on the release schedule. While some felt that Chopra should go ahead with the release because the public, tired and depressed after watching news of the attacks and the aftermath on television screens, would be waiting for a true entertainer to divert its mind, others thought he should postpone the film release as the audiences, not just in Mumbai but all over the country, were still not in a mood to visit theatres.

Promotion 
The first poster of Rab Ne Bana Di Jodi was released in October in theatres and multiplexes across India, with full-page advertisements in national dailies. The first theatrical promo was released on 14 November, with Karan Johar's Dostana. Initially very little was known about the movie, and there were many theories floating around on the Internet about the story. The first music promo of the song "Haule Haule" was released on 2 November 2008, across all leading television channels to coincide with Khan's 43rd birthday. The song promo had received praise from the public.

Home media 
Joginder Tuteja of Bollywood Hungama gave the DVD of Rab Ne Bana Di Jodi 3.5 out of 5 stars stating that it is a good choice if you "want to watch a clean family movie at home." The DVD includes the documentaries, The Making of the Film and The Making of the Songs ("Haule Haule", "Dance Pe Chance", "Phir Milenge Chalte Chalte"), as well as a number of deleted scenes and interviews. The film, was released on Blu-ray a year after its theatrical release.

Reception

Critical reception 
Upon release, the film received mixed reviews. Robert Abele of the Los Angeles Times calls Rab Ne Bana Di Jodi an "agreeably amusing comedy/romance/musical" noting that, "the magnetic Khan is a skilled enough comic actor with his physical transformation—like a Peter Sellers-ish recessive turning into a Jerry Lewis extrovert—that believing Taani wouldn't notice isn't difficult." Rachel Saltz of The New York Times describes it as "soft, sweet and slow, in the words of one of its songs. It deftly blends comedy, the ruling tone of the new Bollywood, with melodrama, the ruling tone of the old." Manish Gajjar of the BBC gave the film 4 out of 5 stars noting that, "Shah Rukh Khan makes you laugh and cry as the nerdy-looking, clumsy, bespectacled Surinder and all hip and happening Raj. A true professional in his own right, Khan breezes through his dialogues during the emotional and comic scenes." Frank Lovece of Film Journal International argues that it is "smarter and more self-aware of its rom-com contrivances than most Hollywood movies" and notes that while "the movie's cleverness eventually devolves into a simplistic Harlequin-Romance-for-males wish-fulfillment about beauty and the geek, it's a very well-acted variation on a Hollywood staple." Critic and author Maitland McDonagh of MissFlickChick.com stated that the film, "has been dismissed in some quarters as self-conscious and artificial, a coyly self-referential reworking of outdated movie tropes a la Todd Haynes' Far From Heaven, but it works for me in a way that most contemporary Hollywood romcoms don't."

The film also received some negative reviews. Rajeev Masand of CNN-IBN was critical, giving it 2 out of 5 stars and stating that "Aditya Chopra's return to direction after 8 years is marked by a flawed script, which in turn spawns a disappointing film. Where's the smart dialogue and the spirited characters that defined his debut film, Dilwale Dulhania Le Jayenge? There's no trace of either in this film...the problem then, at the root of Rab Ne Bana Di Jodi, is that much like those artificial sets in the film, the emotions too are contrived." Derek Elley of Variety argues that the film has "a huge, hollow center that sinks the project early on...A paper-thin script drags itself to the finish line amid tiresome mugging by Khan, a huge credibility gap (she never recognises him without his spectacles and moustache?), and a blah score with only one showstopper (featuring 5 famous actresses)."

A number of critics have further noted the similarities between this movie and superhero films. Khalid Mohamed, of the Hindustan Times, gave the film 3.5 out of 5 stars stating that Surinder "is a soul brother to the mousy Clark Kent-cum-Superman" who "makes you laugh and sob alternately." Mayank Shekhar from Mumbai Mirror gave the film three out of five stars and argues that "[The] same person, oppositely twinned, is usually the stuff of superhero films; the kinds of Clark Kent-Superman, Peter Parker-Spider-Man etc. You feel entirely lost in this fantasy flick because for the most part, it’s built around something so intimate and real. It’d be much easier to travel to foreign countries around far-fetched situations with fake heroes." In addition, Sudish Kamath of The Hindu stated that while Rab Ne Bana Di Jodi could have been an interesting art film exploring the dynamics of an arranged marriage, the director instead "treats this character type like Sam Raimi would treat Spider-Man...Superhero 'Raj' slips into costume and out, complaining about how it gets uncomfortable around the crotch, to win over his Mary Jane with not much saving-the-world business to keep him busy. But while Spidey does it for a bigger reason than just MJ, Raj’s sole motivation is to stalk his wife and play out his fantasy as somebody else. His obsession with his alter-ego reaches new heights when he wants his wife to cheat on the real him—the goofy Surinder Sahni who starts off well."

Box office 
Rab Ne Bana Di Jodi collected  in its opening week. By its fourth week, it had earned , making it Shah Rukh Khan's fifth consecutive blockbuster in 3 years and Aditya Chopra's third blockbuster as a director. The film grossed $8.43 million in the overseas market of which $2.09 million was contributed by the United States and $2.24 million from the UK, and was declared as a blockbuster overseas.

At the end of its theatrical run, it grossed  worldwide, thus becoming Yash Raj Films' and Khan's highest-grossing film at the time of its release. It was the second-highest-grossing film domestically and the highest-grossing in the overseas market that year.

Awards

References

Further reading

External links 
 
 Official trailer - Yash Raj Films
 
 
 
 Rab Ne Bana Di Jodi at Bollywood Hungama
 Rab Ne Bana Di Jodi at Rediff.com
 Rab Ne Bana Di Jodi' at BBC

2008 films
2000s Hindi-language films
Films set in Amritsar
Yash Raj Films films
Indian romantic comedy-drama films
2008 romantic comedy-drama films
Films about marriage
Films directed by Aditya Chopra
Films about dance competitions